A private student loan is a financing option for higher education in the United States that can supplement, but should not replace, federal loans, such as Stafford loans, Perkins loans and PLUS loans. Private loans, which are heavily advertised, do not have the forbearance and deferral options available with federal loans (which are never advertised). In contrast with federal subsidized loans, interest accrues while the student is in college, even if repayment does not begin until after graduation. While unsubsidized federal loans do have interest charges while the student is studying, private student loan rates are usually higher, sometimes much higher. Fees vary greatly, and legal cases have reported collection charges reaching 50% of amount of the loan. Since 2011, most private student loans are offered with zero fees, effectively rolling the fees into the interest rates.

Interest rates and loan terms are set by the financial institution that underwrites the loan, typically based on the perceived risk that the borrower may be delinquent or in default of payments of the loan. Most lenders assign interest rates based on 4-6 tiers of credit scores. The underwriting decision is complicated by the fact that students often do not have a credit history that would indicate creditworthiness. As a result, interest rates may vary considerably across lenders, and some loans have variable interest rates. More than 90% of private student loans to undergraduate students and more than 75% of private student loans to graduate students require a creditworthy cosigner.

Unlike other consumer loans, Congress made student loans, both federal and private, exempt from discharge (cancellation) in the event of a personal bankruptcy, except when repaying the student loan would represent an undue hardship on the borrower and the borrower's dependents. This is a serious restriction that students rarely understand when obtaining a student loan.

Financial aid, including loans, may not exceed the college's cost of attendance.

Parallels to mortgage lending
The increase in use of private student loans came about around 2001 once the increase in the cost of education began to exceed the increase in the amount of federal student aid available.

The recent history of student loans has been compared to the history of the mortgage industry. Similar to the way in which mortgages were securitized and sold off by lenders to investors, student loans were also sold off to investors, thereby eliminating the risk of loss for the actual lender.

Another parallel between the student loan industry and the mortgage industry is the fact that subprime lending has run rampant over the past few years. Just as little documentation was needed to take out a subprime mortgage loan, even less was needed to take out a subprime or "non-traditional" student loan.

Criticisms
After the passage of the bankruptcy reform bill of 2005, even private student loans are not discharged during bankruptcy. This provided a credit-risk-free loan for the lender, averaging 7 percent a year.
  
In 2007, the then-Attorney General of New York State, Andrew Cuomo, led an investigation into lending practices and anti-competitive relationships between student lenders and universities.  Specifically, many universities steered student borrowers to "preferred lenders" which resulted in those borrowers incurring higher interest rates.  Some of these "preferred lenders" allegedly rewarded university financial aid staff with "kickbacks."  This has led to changes in lending policy at many major American universities.  Many universities have also rebated millions of dollars in fees back to affected borrowers.

The biggest lenders, Sallie Mae and Nelnet, are criticized by borrowers. They frequently find themselves embroiled in lawsuits, the most serious of which was filed in 2007. The False Claims Suit was filed on behalf of the federal government by former Department of Education researcher, Dr. Jon Oberg, against Sallie Mae, Nelnet, and other lenders. Oberg argued that the lenders overcharged the U.S. Government and defrauded taxpayers of millions of dollars. In August 2010, Nelnet settled the lawsuit and paid $55 million.

Prior to 2009, most private student loans did not offer death and disability discharges. After the Boston Globe published an article critical of Sallie Mae's failure to discharge the private student loans of a Marine killed in action, Sallie Mae launched a new student loan program with death and disability discharges similar to those available on federal student loans. Since then, about half of private student loans offer death and disability discharges.

In 2011, The New York Times published an editorial endorsing the return of bankruptcy protections for private student loans in response to the economic downturn and universally increasing tuition at all colleges and graduate institutions.

A 2014 report from Consumer Financial Protection Bureau (CFPB), shows a rising problem with these types of loans. Borrowers face “auto-default” when cosigner dies or goes bankrupt. The report shows that some lenders demand immediate full repayment upon the death or bankruptcy of their loan cosigner, even when the loan is current and being paid on time.

Participants
The biggest student loan lender, Sallie Mae, was formerly a government-sponsored entity, which became private between 1997-2004. A number of financial institutions offer private student loans, including banks like Wells Fargo, and specialized companies. There are also a number of state-affiliated, nonprofit student loan lenders, which account for approximately 10% of the private student loan market. This segment includes organizations such as VSAC and Higher Education Loan Authority of the State of Missouri, Student loan search and comparison websites allow visitors to evaluate loan terms from a variety of partner lenders, and financial aid offices in universities typically have a preferred vendor list, but borrowers are free to obtain loans wherever they can find the most favorable terms.

As the economy collapsed in 2008-2011, many players withdrew from the private student loan lending world.  The remaining lenders tightened the credit criteria, making it more difficult to receive a loan.  Most now require a credit-worthy cosigner. After the economic collapse of 2008, a number of peer-to-peer lending and alternative lending platforms emerged to help students find private student loans. For example, U.S. online marketplace lending platform LendKey allows consumers to book loans directly from community lenders like credit unions and community banks.

References

External links 
"The Many Pitfalls of Private Student Loans," New York Times, September 4, 2015

Credit
Student loans in the United States